Theranda is an old Roman settlement in Kosovo.

Theranda may also refer to:

Places

Kosovo 
Therandë, alternate name of Suva Reka

Albania 
Tirana was called by this name in antiquity, named after a castle called Theranda inside the city